Fiddes is a Scottish surname. Notable people with the surname include:

 Alex Fiddes, Scottish rugby union and rugby league footballer
 Christopher Fiddes (born 1934), artist
 Frank Fiddes (1906–?), rower
 George Vandeleur Fiddes (1858–1936), civil servant
 Jim Fiddes (1916–1970), Scottish footballer with Rangers and Falkirk 
 Paul S. Fiddes (born 1947), theologian
 Richard Fiddes (1671–1725), minister and historian

See also
 Fiddes Castle
 Fettes (disambiguation)
 Vettese

English-language surnames
Scottish surnames